The Cyprus women's national volleyball team represents Cyprus in international women's volleyball competitions and friendly matches.

The team won the gold medal at the 2013 edition of the Games of the Small States of Europe in Luxembourg.

The team competes in the European Volleyball Championship of the Small Countries Division.

References

External links
Cyprus Volleyball Federation

Videos
 LIVE XVII GSCE | CYPRUS v MALTA WOMEN'S VOLLEYBALL YouTube.com video

National women's volleyball teams
Volleyball
Volleyball in Cyprus